The Rupes Nigra ("Black Rock"), a phantom island, was believed to be a 33-mile-wide black rock (Mercator actually describes the rock's circumference as 33 "French" miles) located at the Magnetic North Pole or at the North Pole itself. It purportedly explained why all compasses point to this location. The idea came from a lost work titled Inventio Fortunata, and the island featured on maps from the sixteenth and seventeenth centuries, including those of Gerardus Mercator and his successors. Mercator described the island in a 1577 letter to John Dee:

In the midst of the four countries is a Whirl-pool, into which there empty these four indrawing Seas which divide the North. And the water rushes round and descends into the Earth just as if one were pouring it through a filter funnel. It is four degrees wide on every side of the Pole, that is to say eight degrees altogether. Except that right under the Pole there lies a bare Rock in the midst of the Sea. Its circumference is almost 33 French miles, and it is all of magnetic Stone [Jacobus Cnoyen] years ago.

In fiction

In Jules Verne's The Adventures of Captain Hatteras (1866), the North Pole is occupied by Queen Island, created by a volcano (Mount Hatteras) in the middle of an Open Polar Sea.

References

Phantom Arctic islands
Islands of the Arctic Ocean
North Pole